The Cambridge History of China is a series of books published by the Cambridge University Press (CUP) covering the history of China from the founding of the Qin dynasty in 221 BC to 1982 AD. The series was conceived by British historian Denis C. Twitchett and American historian John K. Fairbank in the late 1960s, and publication began in 1978. The complete History will contain 15 volumes made up of 17 books (not including the Cambridge History of Ancient China) with volumes 5 and 9 consisting of two books each.

Chinese history before the Qin dynasty is covered in an independent volume, The Cambridge History of Ancient China (1999) which follows the Pinyin romanization system; the other volumes except vol. 2 use Wade–Giles romanization.
The final volume, Volume 4, was to be published in 2020, but is indefinitely delayed. 
An unauthorized Chinese translation of volume 7 (The Ming Dynasty, 1368–1644, Part 1) was made in 1992 by the Chinese Academy of Social Sciences. In this version, the map of the Ming empire in the original was replaced by a more extensive map from The Historical Atlas of China, while the other maps were used unchanged.

Volumes
The volumes of the series are as follows:
 The Ch'in and Han Empires, 221 BC–AD 220 (edited by Denis Twitchett and Michael Loewe), December 1986. .
The Six Dynasties, 220–589 (edited by Albert E. Dien and Keith N. Knapp), 7 November 2019. .
 Sui and T'ang China, 589–906 AD, Part 1 (edited by Twitchett), September 1979. . This volume covers the political history of the Sui and Tang dynasties.
 Sui and T'ang China, 589–906 AD, Part 2 (edited by Twitchett), . This volume is intended to cover cultural and economic topics related to the Sui and Tang dynasties). [Still unpublished]
 The Sung Dynasty and its Precursors, 907–1279, Part 1 (edited by Twitchett and Paul Jakov Smith), March 2009. . This part covers the political history of the Five Dynasties and Ten Kingdoms and the Song dynasty.
 Sung China, 960–1279 AD, Part 2 (edited by John W. Chaffee and Twitchett), March 2015. . This part covers government, economy, law, education, society, and philosophy of the Song dynasty.
 Alien Regimes and Border States, 907–1368 (edited by Twitchett and Herbert Franke), November 1994. . This volume covers the Khitan Liao dynasty, the Jurchen Jin dynasty, the Tangut Western Xia dynasty, and the Mongol Yuan dynasty.
 The Ming Dynasty, 1368–1644, Part 1 (edited by Frederick W. Mote and Twitchett), February 1988. . This volume covers the political history of the Ming dynasty.
 The Ming Dynasty, 1368–1644, Part 2 (edited by Twitchett and Mote), January 1998. . This volume covers government, law, foreign relations, economy, culture, and religion of the Ming dynasty.
 The Ch'ing Empire to 1800, Part 1 (edited by Willard J. Peterson), December 2002. . This part covers the Manchu conquest of China, and the political history and society of the Qing dynasty from Nurhaci to the Qianlong Emperor.
The Ch'ing Dynasty to 1800, Part 2 (edited by Peterson) April 2016. . This part covers early Qing conquests (Taiwan, Mongolia, Xinjiang, and Tibet) and international relations (Korea, Vietnam, Japan, and maritime Europeans), as well as provincial governance, learning, Taoism, and local elites in the early Qing.
 Late Ch'ing 1800–1911, Part 1 (edited by John K. Fairbank), June 1978. . This volume covers the political history of the last 111 years of Manchu rule over China. online
 Late Ch'ing 1800–1911, Part 2 (edited by Fairbank and Kwang-Ching Liu), September 1980. . This volume covers the economy, foreign relations, political and social changes, and the revolution movement of the late Qing.
 Republican China, 1912–1949, Part 1 (edited by Fairbank and Twitchett), September 1983. .
 Republican China, 1912–1949, Part 2 (edited by Fairbank and Albert Feuerwerker), July 1986. .
 The People's Republic, Part 1: Emergence of Revolutionary China, 1949–1965 (edited by Roderick MacFarquhar and Fairbank), June 1987. .
 The People's Republic, Part 2: Revolutions Within the Chinese Revolution, 1966–1982 (edited by MacFarquhar and Fairbank), November 1991. .

The Cambridge History of Ancient China
The Cambridge History of Ancient China: From the Origins of Civilization to 221 BC edited by Michael Loewe and Edward L. Shaughnessy was published in 1999. This book provides a survey of the institutional and cultural history of China up to the unification of China by Qin Shi Huang in 221 BC. Fourteen specialists on early Chinese history including Robert Bagley, Kwang-chih Chang, Cho-yun Hsu, David Keightley, Mark Edward Lewis, David S. Nivison,  and Jessica Rawson contributed to the book.

Selected reviews

References

See also 
 The Cambridge History of Inner Asia, covering some of the conquest dynasties and Tibet
 The Cambridge History of Chinese Literature

1978 non-fiction books
Cambridge University Press books
History books about China
Sinology
History books about the Sui dynasty
History books about the Tang dynasty
History books about the Five Dynasties and Ten Kingdoms
History books about the Song dynasty
History books about the Liao dynasty
History books about the Jin dynasty (1115–1234)
History books about the Ming dynasty
History books about the Qing dynasty
History books about the Qin dynasty
History books about the Han dynasty
History books about the Yuan dynasty
Cambridge